Jan van Aken (1614 – 25 March 1661 (buried)) was a Dutch Golden Age painter and engraver.

Biography
Van Aken was born and died in Amsterdam, but has been frequently confused with the celebrated German painter Johann van Achen of Cologne. Not much is known of his paintings but Bartsch enumerates twenty-one of his etchings, which are touched in the manner of Herman Saftleven. They are very slight but display great mastery.

Houbraken describes an etching by him from his own design, which he says is very scarce. He terms it the Travellers On Horseback. It is marked  "J.V Aken, inv. et fec.". Among those mentioned are six horses after Pieter van Laer or Bamboccio and six views of the Rhine after Saftleven. 
He was also influenced by Philips Wouwerman.

See also 
Hieronymus Bosch, born Jeroen van Aken

References

External links 
Works by Jan van Aken at the Museum of New Zealand Te Papa Tongarewa
Works by Jan Van Aken at the Fine Arts Museums of San Francisco

Dutch Golden Age painters
Dutch male painters
Painters from Amsterdam
1614 births
1661 deaths
17th-century Dutch people